Gymnoscelis mesophoena is a moth in the Geometridae. It was described by Alfred Jefferis Turner in 1907. It is found in Australia (Queensland) and on the St Matthias Islands of Papua New Guinea.

Subspecies
Gymnoscelis mesophoena mesophoena
Gymnoscelis mesophoena hagia Prout, 1958 (St Matthias Islands)

References

Moths described in 1907
mesophoena